Fags in the Fast Lane is a 2017 Australian action adventure comedy film directed by Josh "Sinbad" Collins and starring Chris Asimos.

Plot

Kitten informs her son Beau that her car got stolen by a grotesque burlesque gang, sending him on a journey to get the car back.

Cast
Chris Asimos as Beau
Ollie Bell as Squirt
Pugsley Buzzard as Chief
Sasha Čuha as Salome
Kitten Natividad as Kitten
Tex Perkins as Narrator 
Leanne Campbell as Val Kyrie
King Khan as Hijra 
Xavier Gouault as Bandy Legged John
Hwee Hall as Rosie
Justine Jones as Billie Jean

Filming
Filming took place in Melbourne, in the Australian state of Victoria.

Reception
David Black of Ozindiecinema.com gave the film a positive review, calling the film "the leader in the current renaissance of Ozploitation movies. Its recent debut at Melbourne’s grand old Astor theatre was packed to the rafters, with the crowd queuing up past the shopping block to get in."

References

External links
 Official site
 
 

Australian action comedy films
2017 action comedy films
2017 films
Films shot in Melbourne
2010s English-language films
2010s Australian films